Shaun Rutherford (born 3 October 1996) is a Scottish footballer who plays as a defender for Tranent Juniors. Rutherford started his career with Livingston, and has also played for Queen of the South, Cowdenbeath and Arbroath on loan.

He currently is playing for Tranent Juniors.

Career
Rutherford began his career at Livingston and was included in the first team squad on 28 September 2013, as an unused substitute in a 5–1 home win against Cowdenbeath in the Scottish Championship. Rutherford played on 3 May 2014 in the final league match of the campaign in a 2–0 home win against Raith Rovers, replacing Marc McNulty in added time.

On 17 June 2015, Rutherford moved to Queen of the South. Rutherford made his debut for Queens away to Rangers at Ibrox on 17 October 2015, replacing Alex Harris for the final three minutes of the 2–1 defeat.
Rutherford moved out on loan to Arbroath of  Scottish League Two on 8 January 2016, initially for the remainder of the season. Rutherford  made his debut for the Smokies on 8 February 2016, playing the entirety of a 1–1 draw against Stirling Albion at Gayfield Park. Arbroath sacked their manager Todd Lumsden on 6 March 2016, after a run of six games without a win. After the former Forfar manager Dick Campbell replaced Lumsden on 8 March 2016, Rutherford returned to Dumfries earlier than scheduled after Arbroath's 2–1 defeat at Hampden Park on 19 March 2016 against Queen's Park.

Rutherford left Palmerston Park at the end of the 2015–16 season, subsequently signing for Scottish League Two side Cowdenbeath in June 2016.

Career statistics

References

External links

1996 births
Living people
Scottish footballers
Association football defenders
Livingston F.C. players
Queen of the South F.C. players
Arbroath F.C. players
Cowdenbeath F.C. players
 Tranent Juniors F.C. players
Scottish Professional Football League players